This is the discography of gospel artist Vickie Winans.

Albums

References

Christian music discographies
Discographies of American artists